Richard Benyon  (1746–1796) was an English landowner and politician who sat in the House of Commons from 1774 to 1796.

Benyon was the son of Richard Benyon, President of Madras and his third wife Mary Tyssen, daughter of Francis Tyssen of Hackney, and was born on 28 June 1746. He was educated at Eton College from 1759 to 1762. He married  Hannah Hulse, daughter of Sir Edward Hulse, 1st Baronet. His father died on 27 September 1774 and he succeeded to his estates at Gidea Hall and Englefield House.

Benyon was a friend and contemporary at Eton of Lord Fitzwilliam, and was returned on his interest as Member of Parliament for Peterborough at a by-election on  16 February 1774. He was returned at Peterborough in a contest in the  1774 general election. The Public Ledger described him as  “A well-meaning honest man”  in 1779. He was returned at Peterborough unopposed in  1780,  1784 and  1790. He followed Lord Fitzwilliam in politics and there is no record of his having spoken in the House.  He did not long survive his re-election in  1796. 

Benyon died ‘of the gout in his stomach’ on 22 August 1796, leaving estates in Essex and Berkshire worth £8,000 p.a. He was succeeded by his son Richard Benyon De Beauvoir. His daughter Emma married William Henry Fellowes and his daughter Maria married George Brodrick, 4th Viscount Midleton.

References

1746 births
1796 deaths
People educated at Eton College
British MPs 1768–1774
British MPs 1774–1780
British MPs 1780–1784
British MPs 1784–1790
British MPs 1790–1796
British MPs 1796–1800
Members of the Parliament of Great Britain for English constituencies
People from Romford
People from Englefield, Berkshire
Benyon family